The Best American Short Stories 1995, a volume in The Best American Short Stories series, was edited by Katrina Kennison and by guest editor Jane Smiley.

Short stories included

References

External links
 Best American Short Stories

1995 anthologies
Fiction anthologies
Short Stories 1995
Houghton Mifflin books